is a video game series, a spin-off of the Mario franchise. It comprises various video games created by Nintendo, starring the character Wario. The series began with Wario Land: Super Mario Land 3, the first game to feature Wario as a playable character. The Wario series includes mostly platforming video games and minigame compilations, but also includes other genres.

Wario Land series

The Wario Land series is a platforming series that started with Wario Land: Super Mario Land 3, following Wario's first appearance in Super Mario Land 2: 6 Golden Coins.

Wario Land games

In Wario Land, Wario has a castle in Kitchen Island, and often journeys to find treasure. Its gameplay consists of platforming through levels, tossing enemies, breaking blocks and using other abilities.

Wario Land characters
 was designed as an antagonist to Mario, and first appeared in the 1992 handheld video game Super Mario Land 2: 6 Golden Coins as the main villain and final boss. Since that time, Wario has developed into the protagonist and antihero of his own video game series spanning both handheld and console markets, in addition to his numerous appearances in spin-offs of the Mario franchise. He is voiced by Charles Martinet, who also voices the Mario, Luigi, and Waluigi characters. Wario and Waluigi seem to have been named with respect to the Japanese word warui [悪い], meaning "bad". Therefore, Wario is a "warui Mario" or "bad Mario", and Waluigi is a "warui Luigi" and "bad Luigi".
 is the main antagonist of Wario Land: Super Mario Land 3 and Wario Land II. She is the leader of a legion of seafaring thieves known as the Brown Sugar Pirates, and is Wario's true archenemy, instead of Mario. She is a technological genius and inventor, constantly building mechanized apparatuses to assist her in attacking whatever target she chooses. The Pirates' base of operations is Kitchen Island, a gigantic coved island in the middle of the ocean, and their main mode of transportation is the S.S. Teacup, a massive pirate ship. She acts as Wario's ally in Wario Land: Shake It! to have him do all of the work for her, however she betrays him in the end and steals his treasure.
 is the main antagonist of Wario Land 3. Rudy lures Wario into the music box world, claiming that he is the god of the world. He convinces Wario to help break the seal that was placed upon him by the other creatures of the world, with the promise of keeping any treasure Wario finds. After the seal is broken, Rudy reveals himself and attacks Wario. Wario defeats him, and the curse on the other inhabitants is broken. Rudy returns in the video game Dr. Mario 64, where he and Mad Scienstein concoct a plan to steal the Megavitamins from Dr. Mario because he has a cold, and wants the power to cure any illness.
 is the main antagonist of Wario Land 4. She is responsible for taking over the golden pyramid that was originally ruled by Princess Shokora whom she placed a curse upon turning her into a black cat. Wario decides to explore the pyramid after reading about its legend in an article. She is not encountered until later in the game when the player gains access to the innermost chamber of the pyramid where various treasures are being kept.
 appears in Wario Land 4. In the game's manual, it is mentioned that she was the original owner of the golden pyramid where the game takes place in, but was cursed by the Golden Diva. In her cursed form, Shokora is capable of shapeshifting, her most common forms being a tiny black cat and a black stick figure. For a price, Wario can get her help in boss fights by inflicting damage on the boss before the fight begins. After Wario recovers her belongings from the pyramid's bosses and destroys the Golden Diva, Shokora is released from the curse and thanks Wario for saving her (though her appearance and Wario's reaction changes based on how many other treasures Wario obtained from the bosses), then is escorted by angels into the heavens.
The  is the main antagonist of Wario Land: Shake It! who kidnaps Queen Merelda and takes the Shake Dimension's treasures, among them the Bottomless Coin Bag that holds an infinite number of coins. Sweet-talked by Captain Syrup with promises of treasure, Wario defeats the Shake King and frees the Shake Dimension from his evil, though this registers as a complete afterthought in Wario's mind.
 appears in Wario Land: Shake It! as the ruler of the Shake Dimension. She is captured by the Shake King in the game's beginning. After being rescued by Wario, Merelda gives him her gratitude, but Wario throws her aside and takes the Bottomless Coin Bag, only for Syrup to steal it from him due to a deal that Merfle made with her.
 appears in Wario Land: Shake It!. She is a small fairy-like creature who helps Wario enter and leave the Shake Dimension. Many of her friends (all of them the same species as Merfle) are captured by the Shake King, and Wario must save them in addition to recovering treasures. At the end of the game, Captain Syrup steals the Bottomless Coin Bag from Wario and Merfle explains that it was already promised to her. This sends Wario into a rage as he chases Merfle through his garage.

Wario: Master of Disguise characters
 is the original star of the television show The Silver Zephyr, in which he is the titular thief. A master of disguise, Cannoli uses his magic wand Goodstyle to change his appearance, but Wario leaps into the television world of the show and steals Goodstyle out of jealousy. Over the course of the game, Cannoli chases Wario demanding Goodstyle back and is a frequent obstacle as he sets traps and attacks Wario in his mechanical Mad Hat vehicle.
 is a sentient magic wand that grants its wearer the power to change their appearance. He has been passed down through the Cannoli family for many generations, but Wario steals him from the current-day Count Cannoli and uses him to become his own alter-ego "The Purple Wind". Goodstyle accepts Wario as his new master and teaches him how to use his power. After Wario defeats Terrormisu, Goodstyle reveals his true form as the very first member of the Cannoli Clan and the one who originally banished Terrormisu. He thanks Wario for his help and gives him all the accumulated wealth of the Cannoli Clan as gratitude. However, Wario discovers that he can't take the treasure out of the television world, leaving him both penniless and furious.
 is a rival thief to Count Cannoli. He owns a corporation called Sigil Securities and can transform into a giant blue ball with a face on it. He initially does not think much of Wario, but quickly realizes that "The Purple Wind" is more than he appears. At one point, Carpaccio teams with Count Cannoli to stop Wario from reassembling the Wishstone, a magical relic that supposedly can grant any wish.
 is a blonde woman in a pink dress who first appears to Wario on Sweatmore Peak and helps him briefly during his search for the Wishstone. After Wario fully reassembles the Wishstone, she reveals her true identity as the demon Terrormisu, the true main antagonist of the game who had been sealed away in the Wishstone by the first of the Cannoli Clan and had been manipulating Wario to reassemble it so she can return and cause disaster. She is ultimately defeated by Wario and runs back into the underworld crying, never to return.

WarioWare series

The series was established in 2003 with the release of Mega Microgame$! for the Game Boy Advance. While the first two games were developed by Nintendo R&D1, subsequent games have been co-developed by Intelligent Systems.

The distinctive feature of all WarioWare games is that they are collections of short, simple "microgames" presented in quick succession. Each of these microgames lasts about three to five seconds and must be completed, or else a life will be lost. For example, there is a microgame where the player must zap a spaceship; in another, Wario must collect coins in a Pac-Man-like maze. The numerous microgames are linked together randomly and steadily increase in speed and difficulty as the player progresses. On each level, losing four games results in a game over. After a certain amount of microgames have been played, the player faces a stage-specific boss microgame; the player must complete these to regain a lost life (with a maximum of four). Boss microgames are considerably longer and more complex than other microgames. For example, a boss microgame in Mega Microgames! instructs the player to hit a nail with a hammer multiple times in a row.

The idea of microgame or minigame was popularized generally during the Nintendo 64's fifth generation of video game consoles and some early minigames appear in the Nintendo 64DD's Mario Artist: Talent Studio in the style that would give rise to the WarioWare series. Certain minigames literally originated in Mario Artist: Polygon Studio, as explained by Goro Abe of Nintendo R&D1's so-called Wario Ware All-Star Team: "In Polygon Studio you could create 3D models and animate them in the game, but there was also a side game included inside. In this game you would have to play short games that came one after another. This is where the idea for Wario Ware came from." Teammate Yoshio Sakamoto continued, "To add on that, we got the idea of using Wario and the other characters because we couldn't think of anyone else who would be best for the role. Wario is always doing stupid things and is really idiotic, so we thought him and the rest of the characters would be best for the game."

Game & Wario, released in 2013, is a spinoff of the WarioWare series.

WarioWare Gold, was announced during a Nintendo Direct presentation on March 8, 2018, and released worldwide later that year.

The latest installment in the series, WarioWare: Get It Together!, was announced during a Nintendo Direct on June 15, 2021, and was released on September 10, 2021.

WarioWare games

Microgames
Microgames are simple video games created by the fictional company WarioWare, Inc.. Nintendo's line of WarioWare games each feature these microgames, which are generally less than 5 seconds long. Microgames are even simpler and shorter than the minigames found in other games such as the Mario Party series. Gameplay in all WarioWare games is distinct from most other games, as they involve the player or players trying to beat the microgames as soon as possible. Most games present instructions in the form of a verb and quickly drop the player into the situation where they must perform said verb. The extremely stripped-down gameplay has intrigued some game researchers, who have used WarioWare both as a case study in understanding the relationship between rules and play in videogames, and as a target domain for investigating automated game design.

All microgames are strung together in a random order within different "stages", each hosted by a different character. First, the player is presented with a quick one or two word instruction such as "Eat!" or "Rub!" Then, the microgame will appear and the player will have to complete the game according to the instruction.

Microgames usually have only one task to complete. For example, in one microgame the player is told to "Enter!" and is presented with a scene from The Legend of Zelda. The player must use the directional buttons to move Link to a cave entrance before the time runs out. In another microgame, the player is told to "Avoid!" and must drive a car, avoiding oncoming traffic. Most microgames have a sound bite that signifies when the task is completed.  The games by themselves are so brief so as to potentially demand the sharp reflexes of a quick-time event.

Boss microgames always occur at a set point in a stage. They are usually more challenging than regular microgames, have no time limit (as described below), and give lives back upon completion. If a stage is played for the first time, it is completed after the boss microgame. The sound bite will usually play after the task is fulfilled, and then the score screen will return. On repeated plays, if the player has less than four lives, one will be restored.

The unit of time for all microgames is beats. In Mega Microgames! and Twisted!, a standard microgame is 8 beats, double-length microgames (usually IQ-genre games) last 16 beats; Fronk's microgames in Twisted! and Gold only last 4 beats. In most games, the BPM will start out relatively slow and will increase as the player completes microgames.

In WarioWare: Touched!, the 8-beat standard has been dropped for all microgames, so many last longer than 8 beats. This may be a difficulty curve for those unaccustomed to the Nintendo DS's touch-screen interface. To retain pace, the microgames will automatically end if cleared before a four-beat measure is met.

To show the time left to complete a microgame, a small "bomb" appears at the bottom of the screen. The fuse and a countdown timer show the amount of time left to complete the microgame. When time runs out, the bomb explodes and in most cases, the player loses a life. The fuse burns faster when the BPM increases.

Some microgames are intrinsically harder than others, and an increased BPM (increased speed) will make any microgame more difficult to complete than the same microgame at a slower BPM. This is usually reflected in the microgames' "clear scores"—the score one must reach while playing a microgame in the practice modes to obtain credit for "clearing" it. (Smooth Moves and D.I.Y. lack this feature.)

Each microgame features three difficulty levels: Blue, Yellow and Red. Blue presents the given task in an easier way, while Red presents it in a much harder way. Not all modes of all WarioWare games actually show a color to denote the current level, but most modes start with Blue games, progressing to Yellow upon a "Level Up" (usually achieved after passing a boss microgame), then to Red in similar fashion. Once Red is reached, sequential "Level Up"s will typically be replaced by "Speed Up"s (an increase in BPM).

Using the above The Legend of Zelda microgame as an example, the Blue version of this microgame usually places Link very close to the cave entrance that he must enter. The Yellow version places the entrance further away and places an enemy that blocks Link, and the Red version places the entrance yet further, and has a second enemy that shoots at Link from a lake.

WarioWare characters
There are two major types of character in the WarioWare series. The first are the WarioWare, Inc. developers, who both create and host the microgames. Each one has a unique theme or twist, depending on the game. For instance, Jimmy T.'s microgames in Twisted! are focused around large spins, while in Touched! his microgames involve rubbing objects with the stylus. The second group of characters often show up within the introduction cutscenes — the most notable being Fronk, who hosts "Pop-Up" microgames in Twisted! and Gold and pops up in the most unlikely of places.

Major characters
 is 9-Volt's mother and makes a few appearances in the WarioWare games. She is never fully seen until Game & Wario, and is a human like her son. 5-Volt lives along with her son and his pet Fronk in a house in Diamond City. She makes her first appearance in WarioWare: Twisted!, where she shouts at 9-Volt to go to bed since he was playing with 18-Volt all day. 5-Volt is seen only from behind, and from the knees down. After 9-Volt has gone to bed, he still furtively plays with his Game Boy Advance SP under the bedspread, but his mother catches him when she opens his room's door a second time. 5-Volt's silhouette is seen in the doorway. 5-Volt is seen again in WarioWare: Touched!, as a silhouette in the Game Over screen of 9-Volt and 18-Volt's stage. She watches her son and his friend eating cake. In Game and Wario, she has a more major role as the main obstacle in the “Gamer” minigame. In Super Smash Bros. for Wii U and Super Smash Bros. Ultimate, she appears as a stage hazard in the Gamer stage. She appears again in WarioWare Gold with her own microgames that are all based on Nintendo games, just like 9-Volt's and 18-Volt's. She is voiced by Cristina Vee in Gold and Ruriko Aoki in the Japanese version.
 is a young Nintendo fanatic, owning everything ever made by Nintendo. 9-Volt's microgames are all based on Nintendo games. He is voiced by Melissa Hutchison in Gold and Makoto Koichi in the Japanese version.
 is 9-Volt's best friend, and is also a fan of video games. He is large, but despite his size, he goes to Diamond Elementary School, as does 9-Volt. His other defining trait is the boom box he always carries; his loud music gets him into trouble on his first day of school, although he soon finds an admirer in 9-Volt. He is voiced by Edward Bosco in Gold and Subaru Kimura in the Japanese version.
 is a 15 year-old witch-in-training, who lives in a haunted mansion in Diamond City with a little demon named Red. She has long black hair in two long ponytails. Ashley makes a cameo appearance in Super Smash Bros. for Nintendo 3DS and Wii U as an Assist Trophy character. Ashley also appears in Super Mario Maker as an unlockable Mystery Mushroom costume. Ashley reprised her role as an Assist Trophy in Super Smash Bros. Ultimate. Ashley is voiced by Erica Lindbeck in Gold, Yumi Yoshimura in the Japanese version, while Red is voiced by Tyler Shamy and Mako Muto in the Japanese version.
They also work as cabbies, and their cab, which was designed by Dr. Crygor, has the ability to go anywhere. Dribble is a large anthropomorphic bulldog with red hair. He is large, burly, and seems gruff, but he is actually quite calm and friendly. Spitz is a yellow anthropomorphic cat. He is always squinting and wears goggles. Their levels generally involve picking up a weird customer and forgetting to ask for the fare. Dribble is voiced by Kyle Hebert in Gold, Yuma Kametani in the Japanese version, while Spitz is voiced by Griffin Puatu and Kazuya Yamaguchi in the Japanese version.
 is a quirky scientist whose inventions include his cryogenic suit, Mike, the karaoke robot that would "solve all his cleaning needs", the Super MakerMatic 21, and the Kelerometer diet machine. One of the character card descriptions in WarioWare Gold states that he is over 100 years old. He is the grandfather of Penny Crygor. In WarioWare: Touched, Dr. Crygor accidentally gets caught in his latest invention and is younger and more fit, with red accents to his costume, as well as a full helmet. These changes remain for a part of WarioWare: Smooth Moves. He is voiced by Kyle Hebert in Gold and Kensuke Matsui in the Japanese version.
The  are a strange, blocky, yellow species of creatures. They appear constantly throughout all the WarioWare games, both in microgames and cutscenes. 9-Volt apparently even keeps one of them as a pet, calling it "Shag." In addition to several varieties of yellow Fronk, there are also red and blue varieties; their faces vary individually from each other. 9-Volt's pet Fronk is voiced by Todd Haberkorn in Gold.
 is a man with a large blue afro wig, who is a disco dancing fanatic. Jimmy is always seen frequenting hot Diamond City night spots, particularly Club Sugar. His family, which also dances with him includes Papa T. and Mama T., and his brother and sister, James T. and Jamie T. He also has a doppelganger named Jimmy P. whose hair is a different color to his. Their levels often involve remixing the games from previous stages. He is voiced by Vegas Trip in Gold.
Kat has pink hair with a single ponytail, while Ana has orange hair with two ponytails. They have four pets: Don the Sparrow, Shadow the Dog, Shuriken the Falcon, and Numchuck the Monkey. Kat & Ana make a cameo appearance in Super Smash Bros. Brawl and Super Smash Bros. for Nintendo 3DS and Wii U as Assist Trophy characters and regular trophies. Kat is voiced by Stephanie Sheh in Gold, Maya Enoyoshi in the Japanese version, while Ana was voiced by Fryda Wolff and Yui Matsuyama in the Japanese version.
 is a young girl who made her appearance in WarioWare Gold and WarioWare: Get It Together!, coming from an isolated town called Luxeville. Despite her age, she is very smart and brave, considering how she's able to battle Wario Deluxe. She seems to view herself as a hero of sorts, as supported by her saying "Lulu...the greatest hero ever.." in her sleep during one of the cutscenes. She is voiced by Alex Cazares.
 is a karaoke robot made by Dr. Crygor. Despite being a robot built for karaoke, the slightly mad doctor programs him to be a cleaning robot. Eventually, Mike overrides his cleaning program with his karaoke program by blowing on a pile of dust. He is voiced by Robbie Daymond in Gold.
 is a high school student with different part-time jobs in each game. Mona is quite adventurous, cheerful and culturally savvy. She always seems to be late to wherever she is going, often speeds on her scooter to make up for lost time, and uses the assistance of her animal companions to stop anyone trying to slow her down. Her former occupations include working at a gelato shop, pizza delivery girl on Mona Pizza, bassist, football cheerleader, and a temple explorer. Also, Mona has a crush on Wario. She is voiced by Stephanie Sheh in Gold.
 is an intelligent alien. He has an IQ of 300. The instruction manual for WarioWare, Inc.: Mega Microgame$! and WarioWare Gold both imply that Orbulon was born in the year 0. Orbulon first wishes to conquer Earth, but after crash-landing on the planet, he settles into life on Earth and ends his mission of conquest. He is voiced by Robbie Daymond in Gold.
 is the granddaughter of Dr. Crygor and dreams of becoming a great scientist. Her stage in WarioWare Gold reveals that she also has a hidden desire to become a singer. Penny sees her grandfather as an excellent scientist, though she also recognizes his eccentric nature. She is voiced by Fryda Wolff in Gold.
 is a character that has his own game in almost every WarioWare title, each one varying in style. The original Pyoro game is Wario's inspiration to found WarioWare, Inc.. Pyoro resembles a round red bird with a white belly, short wings, and a very stretchy tongue. Pyoro 2 (from the GBA version) is the only game where Pyoro is yellow with a tail. Pyoro also appears as a title character in Bird & Beans, the DSi re-release.
 is first introduced in WarioWare: Smooth Moves. He has flowing black hair with white streaks and a blue outfit. He practices martial arts and trains with his master, Master Mantis, in the hopes of becoming a kung-fu master. Young Cricket is voiced by Robbie Daymond in Gold, while Master Mantis is voiced by Owen Thomas.

Minor characters
 is a female teenager who appears in 18-Volt's stage from WarioWare Gold. She steals a kid's video games, but 18-Volt gives them back after beating 13-Amp in a rap battle. 13-Amp is voiced by Cristina Vee.
4.1 and 4.2 are Mona's two wolflike pets who made their first appearance in WarioWare: Touched! (2004). 4.1 and 4.2 only appear during Mona's story. When Vanessa sics The Dinosaurs, other members of her band, in their hawk-like plane on Mona when she travels to the Hawt House, they steal Art, a member of Mona's band, from her van. Pizza Joe comes in, along with her three other animals, to reclaim him. Unfortunately, Mona's animals fail miserably. Joe then distracts The Dinosaurs long enough for 4.1 and 4.2 to come in and use their soccer ball launcher on the Dinosaurs plane. Sadly, even they were unable to save Art from the Dinosaurs. 4.1 and 4.2 have not been seen since.
 is a robot who appears in WarioWare Gold that was created by Dr. Crygor before Mike. While on an expedition in Agate Forest, they encounter her and Doris 1 chases Dr. Crygor for abandoning her. After that, they take her back to Dr. Crygor's Lab, where she is forgiven.
 is the owner of the Sweet Spot Bakery that Wario visits in the game WarioWare: Touched! (2004). After the dentist Dr. Payne told Wario to stay away from all sweets, (since he got a cavity from eating too many sweets) he left the Dental Clinic and picked up the scent from the bakery. Ignoring what the dentist said, Wario asked Bridget the Baker to give him 10 pies. After a few bites Wario got another cavity and the pain sent him all the way to the Dental Clinic. While he flew away, Bridget bid him goodbye with a friendly "Thank you, come again."
 is a demon who appears in WarioWare Gold who makes a monster very hungry. According to Red, he is never satisfied, mean and breathes fire. After being defeated by Ashley, he changes into a different person. His name is a play on the word "hungry".
 is an anthropomorphic beagle who made his first appearance in WarioWare, Inc.: Mega Microgames! (2004). He usually appears alongside Mona, often as a co-worker. Like Mona, he has several occupations throughout the series, such as a gelato shop worker and clothing store owner. He is voiced by Kyle Hebert in Gold.
 is a pop singer from WarioWare: Touched!, her main appearance being as the antagonist of Mona's story, Cute Cuts.
 is Diamond City's popular singer who made her first appearance in WarioWare: Twisted! (2004). She appears during Mona's storyline as the singer for Mona Pizza's commercial.

Other games

Wario has starred in puzzle games such as Mario & Wario and Wario's Woods (the latter of which he was featured as the main antagonist while Toad took the role as the main hero), as well as crossing over into the Bomberman universe with Wario Blast: Featuring Bomberman! (1994).

Appearances in other game series
Wario is a playable character in the Super Smash Bros. series, having appeared since Super Smash Bros. Brawl. His default outfit in these games is his motorcyclist outfit as seen in the WarioWare games, although he can also wear his classic overalls. He can transform into Wario-Man after obtaining a Smash Ball. His motorcycle is used as one of his special attacks. Kat and Ana also make appearances as an Assist Trophy. In Brawl, many stickers also represent WarioWare, Inc. — in addition to all of the above appearing as stickers and trophies, there are stickers of other WarioWare characters. Also, there is a WarioWare stage, named WarioWare, Inc., based on the Variety Tower location from WarioWare, Inc.: Mega Microgames! with several different microgames that run in the background, one of which features Jimmy T. Completing the tasks set by the games awards power-ups like invincibility or growth. This stage also features Ashley's Song, Mike's Theme and Mona Pizza's Song as background music. All three are featured in Japanese and English. In the game's Adventure Mode, he is in league with the Subspace Army. Wario is once again playable in Super Smash Bros. for Nintendo 3DS and Wii U, however he now appears as unlockable, instead of being available from the start as in the previous game. The 3DS version retains the WarioWare, Inc. stage from Brawl, while the Wii U version has a stage based on the Gamer sub-game in Game & Wario. Ashley, another character from WarioWare, is also included as an Assist Trophy in Super Smash Bros. for Nintendo 3DS and Wii U, and Super Smash Bros. Ultimate, and a downloadable Mii costume in Super Smash Bros. for Nintendo 3DS and Wii U.

The Alien Bunnies from Orbulon's stage in Mega Microgame$ make an appearance in Rhythm Tengoku, a game developed by the same team, and also make brief appearances in its sequel, Rhythm Heaven. A later sequel, Rhythm Heaven Megamix features two unlockable challenges called "Wario...Where?" that remix several of the minigames to feature characters from the WarioWare series.

Notes

References

Video game franchises
 
Nintendo franchises
Video games about witchcraft
Video game franchises introduced in 1994
WarioWare